U.S. Route 395 (US 395) is a United States Numbered Highway, stretching from Hesperia, California to the Canadian border in Laurier, Washington. The California portion of US 395 is a  route which traverses from Interstate 15 (I-15) in Hesperia, north to the Oregon state line in Modoc County near Goose Lake. The route clips into Nevada, serving the cities Carson City and Reno, before returning to California.

Prior to truncation, US 395 served the metropolitan areas of San Diego, Riverside, and San Bernardino. The highway serves as a connection to the Los Angeles area for the communities of the Owens Valley, Mammoth Lakes and Mono Lake. The highway is used as an access route for both the highest point in the contiguous United States, Mount Whitney, and the lowest point in North America, Death Valley.

The corridor has been used since the California gold rush, and before numbering was known by several names including El Camino Sierra.

Route description
The route of US 395 in California is split into two segments, as the highway exits and reenters California via Nevada. The southern segment crosses the Mojave Desert and Owens Valley and passes east of the Sierra Nevada. The northern segment also follows the Sierra Nevada and crosses the Modoc Plateau.

US 395 is part of the California Freeway and Expressway System, and part of the National Highway System, a network of highways that are considered essential to the country's economy, defense, and mobility by the Federal Highway Administration. US 395 is eligible to be included in the State Scenic Highway System, and is officially designated as a scenic highway by the California Department of Transportation from Fort Independence to Fort Springs Road in Inyo County, and from the Inyo–Mono county line to south of Walker. This designation means that there are substantial sections of highway passing through a "memorable landscape" with no "visual intrusions", where the potential designation has gained popular favor with the community.

Mojave Desert

US 395 begins in Hesperia at a partial interchange with I-15 as it heads north. The road then enters Adelanto, on the western edge of Victorville. Victorville, founded by the Santa Fe Railroad to take advantage of water along the Mojave River, and for most of its history home to George Air Force Base, was the second fastest growing city in the United States from July 2006 to July 2007. Although US 395 was once a rural road passing to the side of these cities, with growth these cities are encroaching on the highway and changing its character from rural to suburban.
After leaving the Victorville area, the scenery changes as suburban neighborhoods disappear and the highway traverses the Mojave Desert. While crossing the desert, the route clips the northeastern corner of Edwards Air Force Base. Just past the base, the road intersects State Route 58 (SR 58) at Kramer Junction. This was formerly an at-grade intersection; however, SR 58 was rerouted onto a new freeway alignment on October 24, 2019.

After leaving Kramer Junction, US 395 passes the Kramer Junction Solar Electric Generating Station. It then crosses the Rand and El Paso Mountains, where the highway crosses from San Bernardino County into Kern County, near Johannesburg. While traversing these mountains, the route crosses a former Southern Pacific rail line, now owned by the Union Pacific Railroad (UP) that loosely follows the route of SR 14 through the Mojave. Though the railroad is abandoned north of Searles Station, US 395 parallels the old railroad grade from this point to Lone Pine.

On the other side of the mountains is Indian Wells Valley. US 395 passes between the cities of Ridgecrest and Inyokern, where US 395 Business is routed on South China Lake Boulevard.
US 395 follows the western boundary of the Naval Air Weapons Station China Lake, not far from Big and Little Petroglyph Canyons, where the Coso People created prolific rock art and traded with distant tribes using tools crafted of stone. The highway proceeds diagonally across the valley, until merging with SR 14. Prior to July 1, 1964, the part of SR 14 between I-5 and US 395 was part of US 6 that continued south to Long Beach.

Between Mojave and its junction with US 395, SR 14 follows the edge of the Sierra Nevada mountains. Formerly, US 6 and US 395 ran concurrently from this junction north to Bishop. US 395 follows the valleys along the eastern edge of the Sierra Nevada as the mountains gradually increase in altitude until reaching their peak at over  near Lone Pine. After passing by three small lakes, Little Lake and North and South Haiwee Reservoirs, the highway enters the Owens Valley.

Owens Valley
US 395 traverses the entire length of the Owens Valley, entering the valley near the former site of the Owens Lake. The valley, named for one of explorer John C. Fremont's guides, was primarily home to the Timbisha and Paiute peoples before European settlement. Formerly a fertile lake and valley, Owens Lake and the southern portion of the valley are now dry. Water from the valley is channeled for use by the City of Los Angeles, via the Los Angeles Aqueduct, which was constructed during what is commonly called the California Water Wars.
Along the shores of Owens Lake, the highway passes by Cartago and Olancha. Just north of the lake is Lone Pine. Lone Pine is noted as an access for both the highest point in the contiguous United States, Mount Whitney, and the lowest point in North America, Badwater Basin in Death Valley. Both Mount Whitney and the mountains surrounding Death Valley are visible from US 395. From Lone Pine to Bishop, the US 395 corridor loosely follows another abandoned rail line, the Carson and Colorado Railroad, although for most of this run the rail line runs on the eastern edge of the valley, while the road mostly runs on the west edge. The US 395 corridor from Lone Pine north to the Nevada state line is noted for a high concentration of natural hot springs leading to the area being known as the "hot springs jackpot".

Past Lone Pine, the highway passes by Manzanar National Historic Site, a concentration camp where Japanese Americans were imprisoned during World War II. The next community is Independence, the county seat of Inyo County and the home to the Eastern California Museum. Just north is the small Fort Independence Indian Reservation and the Tinemaha Reservoir. Nearby is where the Los Angeles Aqueduct is tapped from the Owens River; with more vegetation visible north of this point. In this portion of the valley is Big Pine and the Big Pine Indian Reservation. From here to Bishop the highway is overlapped with SR 168.

At the north end of the valley sits Bishop, the largest city in the Owens Valley. Bishop serves as a gateway for the recreation areas of the Sierra Nevada, including Mammoth Mountain. At the north end of Bishop is the former separation with, and current terminus of, US 6, a  route which travels eastward across the US to Provincetown, Massachusetts on the east coast. This point is also where US 395 departs from former rail corridors, with the former Carson and Colorado grade following the modern US 6 corridor towards Hawthorne and Tonopah, Nevada. From here to Gardnerville, the highway is routed across spur ranges of the Sierra Nevada mountains.

Sierra Nevada

US 395 scales the Sierra Nevada on a ridge between the canyons of the Owens River and Rock Creek. The highway enters Mono County midway up the ascent, which is known as the Sherwin Grade.

After cresting Sherwin Summit, the highway travels along the west shore of Crowley Lake. Crowley Lake is a reservoir for the Los Angeles aqueduct, which is supplied by the Owens River. However, US 395 does not resume following the river, instead cutting across the Long Valley Caldera to serve the ski resort areas of Mammoth Lakes and Mammoth Mountain via SR 203, after paralleling the runway of the Mammoth Yosemite Airport.

This summit separates the Owens River watershed from that of Mono Lake, a salt lake approximately three times as salty as the ocean.

Along the descent towards Mono Lake, the highway passes near the community of June Lake, a recreation area where there are several freshwater lakes famous for trout fishing, and the June Mountain Ski Area. The June Lake area is served from June Lake Junction by the June Lake Loop Road (SR 158).

Just before arriving at Mono Lake, US 395 has a brief concurrency with SR 120; the two routes separate at the southern end of Lee Vining.

Visible for miles, the highway finally passes Mono Lake, squeezed between the lake and the Sierra crest. The next geographic feature is Conway Summit. At  in altitude, this is the highest point along US 395, and the highest point along a U.S. Highway in California. This Summit also separates the Mono Lake watershed from that of the East Walker River.

The highway descends Conway Summit via the tributaries of the East Walker River, heading towards Bridgeport and Bridgeport Reservoir. Along the descent the highway passes by Bodie, a ghost town which the state park system has preserved, including items still on the shelves in the abandoned stores.

The fourth summit crossed by US 395 in California is Devil's Gate Pass, elevation , which separates the East and West Walker Rivers. The winding descent from Devil's Gate follows the West Walker River, exiting near the towns of Walker and Coleville in the Antelope Valley, a few miles south of Topaz Lake  which is on the California-Nevada State Line.

Nevada

Topaz Lake is where US 395 leaves California, to serve the Reno and Carson City metropolitan areas before returning to California. When the highway passes from California to Nevada it is near the area where  the larger  Sierra Nevada in California separates from the Pine Nut Mountains of Nevada. The highway crosses one more pass, Simee Dimeh Summit, before completely exiting the mountains. The highway returns to California following the receding escarpment of the Sierra.

Honey Lake
US 395 returns to California as a freeway, but is soon downgraded to a divided highway just past the state line. The road follows Long Valley Creek along the edge of the Sierra towards Honey Lake. From this point north, the highway follows a rail line originally built by the Nevada-California-Oregon Railway; the line is now owned by the Union Pacific Railroad.

The highway enters the state in a corner of Sierra County, entering Lassen County just  later. A short segment in Lassen County is a freeway with one exit serving SR 70 at the Hallelujah Junction. This exit is numbered 8, even though it resides hundreds of miles from the origin of the highway; the exit number instead uses the distance from the point of re-entry to California. Though SR 70 does not directly serve any major cities, the highway is noted as an all-weather crossing of the Sierras. SR 70 was at one time numbered U.S. Route 40 Alternate, using US 395 from this junction south to Reno to connect with the mainline US 40 (now I-80). Though using US 40 ALT and US 395 is a much longer route between Reno and Sacramento than mainline US-40 ( versus ), the alternate route was more likely to be open during winter storms than US 40, which crested the Sierra at Donner Pass.

The highway proceeds towards and around the west side of  Honey Lake while en route to Susanville. Although Susanville is used as a control city, US 395 does not technically enter the city. In a T-intersection with SR 36 just before Susanville, US 395 makes a sharp turn avoiding the city, making a near complete loop around the Susanville Municipal Airport.

Modoc Plateau
North of Susanville, the highway bends around Shaffer Mountain and crosses the Modoc Plateau. While en route, the highway serves the towns of Ravendale, Termo, and Madeline in Lassen County, as well as Likely in Modoc County. Here US 395 parallels the South Fork of the Pit River until the confluence with the north fork in Alturas. Past the confluence, the highway follows North Fork Pit River across Modoc County toward Goose Lake. The last junction in California is with SR 299, former U.S. Route 299, in Alturas. SR 299 can be used to travel west all the way to the western side of California at US 101 in Arcata, and east to Nevada State Route 8A at the Nevada state line. The two highways are briefly concurrent from Alturas to the XL Ranch Indian Reservation. US 395 travels in a north-northeast direction for the last  in California, paralleling the east shore of Goose Lake just before crossing the Oregon state line at New Pine Creek, Oregon.

History

Camino Sierra

The Camino Sierra was a trail from Los Angeles to Lake Tahoe loosely paralleling modern State Route 14,  US 395, and State Route 89. The trail was first believed to be used by Jedediah Smith in 1826. The trail was in common use by prospectors passing through the area because of the California gold rush and Comstock Lode. Though this area was not directly affected by the gold and silver rushes, the Owens Valley was more fertile than the areas around the strikes in Nevada. Farmers and ranchers raised cattle and other goods to trade with the mining boom towns nearby. The town of Bishop was established to trade goods with the mining town of Aurora.  By 1860, the Camino Sierra was an established trail appearing in maps and guides. After these mining rushes died down, the Camino Sierra saw a revival because of the construction of the Los Angeles Aqueduct beginning in 1908. The route was promoted for its scenic value by the Southern Pacific Railroad, as a side trip from its rail lines, as far back as 1912. By 1918, the Camino Sierra had been included in the Automobile Blue Book, an early road atlas of the United States.

Rail lines
Both the northern and southern segments of the US 395 corridor were used by railroads built in the 1880s branching from the First transcontinental railroad in Nevada. Both lines were intended to connect the main Southern Pacific Railroad line in Nevada with other lines, but were never completed.

On May 20, 1880, the Carson and Colorado Railway was formed, with the intent of extending a rail line from the existing Virginia and Truckee Railroad at Hawthorne, Nevada through the Owens Valley towards the Colorado River. Though the rail line was never finished, it did bring economic development to the valley. The railroad was never completed past Keeler on the shores of Owens Lake. This line was acquired by the Southern Pacific Railroad in 1900. There were plans to connect this narrow gauge line with SP's standard gauge lines in the area, however these plans never materialized and the narrow gauge line was scrapped in 1959.

The corridor for the northern segment was first used by the Nevada-California-Oregon Railway, a line also started in 1880, at Reno, to connect with the Great Northern Railway in Oregon. This line also was never completed, ending at Lakeview, Oregon. A portion of this line is still active and, through a series of acquisitions, the Union Pacific Railroad now owns this line. The portion from Reno to Hallelujah Junction is used as a connection between the Union Pacific's two main lines in northern California/Nevada, the Overland Route (First Transcontinental Railroad) and the Feather River Route.

Current designation

As first commissioned in 1926, US 395 was a minor spur route of U.S. Route 195 connecting Spokane, Washington with Canada. During the 1930s, US 395 was extended from Spokane to San Diego, over the Camino Sierra, using several existing state routes. The extension first appeared on the Official Nevada Highway map in 1935 and its Californian equivalent in 1936. By 1937, US 6 had been extended to California, concurrent with US 395 between Bishop and Inyokern.

The new southern terminus of US 395 was at Pacific Highway (former US 101) in San Diego. Traveling north, US 395 traversed much of the path of modern SR 163 and I-15 to Poway Road, where it routed to the east along much of today's Pomerado Road to Lake Hodges, with various realignments over the years. Portions of Pomerado Road today are signed "Historic US 395". At Lake Hodges the highway crossed a now-replaced bridge to Escondido.

Past Escondido, the route passed through Fallbrook, using portions of what is now SR 78 and SR 76 before returning to I-15 near Temecula. This portion was straightened to the route of modern I-15 by 1960. Past Temecula, the route followed SR 79, SR 74, I-215, and I-15 until reaching the modern terminus in Hesperia. This part would also be straightened with the construction of what is now I-215. In 1969, the portion south of Hesperia was removed and assigned to other routes.

Over time, the road was paved, upgraded and straightened. Some parts are now built to freeway standards. Among the more notable upgrades, the Los Peñasquitos Creek Arch Bridge, along the portion of former US 395 now used by I-15, was built in 1949, and replaced in 1964, with a second span built in 1977.

Future
Currently US 395 runs as a surface street through most of the cities and towns it serves. However, numerous proposals for bypasses of several of the towns along the route have been proposed, with varying degrees of progress since first proposal. Proposals with no current construction include longstanding proposals to bypass Bishop,  and a freeway bypass of the current surface route through Adelanto, Victorville, and Hesperia. 

In 2022 construction began on a bypass of Olancha and Cartago, which has been controversial as most residents preferred improving the existing route. Once finished, the northern portion, through Cartago, is proposed to become a county route. While the southern portion, through Olancha, would be become an extension of SR 190. 

With the fast growth of the Victorville area Caltrans and the county governments have noted a dramatic increase in congestion and accidents along the route. While short term fixes are in progress to increase capacity the governments note the numerous fixes already implimented along US 395 have failed to reduce congestion or increase safety and a freeway bypass is likely needed. The frustration over a lack of progress on a freeway bypass of the Victorville area has led to community protests and petitions to accelerate progress for a freeway alignment of US 395.

Major intersections

See also

References

External links

Roadside Heritage by ESICE
The Three Flags Highway: US 395 at Floodgap Roadgap by Cameron Kaiser
El Camino Sierra by Lloyd L. Chambers; hosted by Ray Delea
U.S. Route 395 - Desert to Mountains by Casey Cooper
U.S. Highway 395 California by AARoads
U.S. Highway 395 by Daniel P. Faigin
U.S. Highway 395: California's 'mother road' from the Los Angeles Times
Caltrans: Route 395 highway conditions

 California
Mojave Desert
Owens Valley
395
95-3
U.S. Route 395
U.S. Route 395
U.S. Route 395
U.S. Route 395
U.S. Route 395
U.S. Route 395
U.S. Route 395
Modoc Plateau
Sierra Nevada (United States)